Ek Chutki Aasman is an Indian soap opera which aired on Sahara One in 2010.

Plot
This story is about a 7 year old girl named Chutki. She brings happiness to everywhere she goes. The story takes a turn when she goes to Mumbai to find her mother and gets lost.

Cast
 Chhavi Mittal  as Himangi Agashe
 Rajesh Shringarpure as Ganesh
 Deiptimaan Chowdhury as Arjun
 Roshni Parekh as Chutki
 Seerat Ain Alam as Sonali
 Pritish Roy as Bablya
 Amar Sharma as Anjali's Husband
 Smriti Mohan as Anjali
 Manav Sohal as Ramakant
 Rajeev Bharadwaj as Aaji's Elder Son
 Alok Narula
 Rajeev Aryan as Advocate

References

Indian television soap operas
Sahara One original programming
Indian drama television series
2010 Indian television series debuts
2010 Indian television series endings